Lee Geon (born 8 January 1996) is a South Korean footballer who plays as winger for Seongnam FC in K League 1.

Career
Lee Geon has joined newly formed club Ansan Greeners FC in 2017.

References

External links 

1996 births
Living people
Association football wingers
South Korean footballers
Ansan Greeners FC players
Seongnam FC players
K League 2 players
K League 1 players
Chung-Ang University alumni